Ashley Morgan may refer to:

Ashley Morgan (Hustle), character from the television series Hustle
Ash Morgan, contestant in The Voice UK (series 2)